Killinure Lough is a lake in County Westmeath, Ireland, which feeds into Lough Ree on the Shannon.

Wildlife

The lough is a brown trout and eel fishery.

See also 
 List of loughs in Ireland

References 

Lakes of County Westmeath